The 2011 Nigerian Senate election in Lagos State was held on April 11, 2015, to elect members of the Nigerian Senate to represent Lagos State. Oluremi Tinubu representing Lagos Central, Gbenga Bareehu Ashafa representing Lagos East and Ganiyu Solomon representing Lagos West all won on the platform of Action Congress of Nigeria.

Overview

Summary

Results

Lagos Central 
The two major parties Action Congress of Nigeria and People's Democratic Party registered with the Independent National Electoral Commission to contest in the election. ACN candidate Oluremi Tinubu won the election, defeating PDP candidate Tolagbe Animashaun and other party candidates.

Lagos East 
The two major parties Action Congress of Nigeria and People's Democratic Party registered with the Independent National Electoral Commission to contest in the election. ACN candidate Gbenga Bareehu Ashafa won the election, defeating PDP candidate Al-mustain Abani Vonda and other party candidates.

Lagos West 
The two major parties Action Congress of Nigeria and People's Democratic Party registered with the Independent National Electoral Commission to contest in the election. ACN candidate Ganiyu Solomon won the election, defeating PDP candidate M. Salvador and other party candidates.

References 

April 2011 events in Nigeria
Lag
Lagos State Senate elections